Keswick Museum is a local museum based in Keswick in the English Lake District, which exhibits aspects of the landscape, history and culture of the area.

History
The collection was established as the Keswick Museum of Local and Natural History, a creation of the Keswick Literary and Scientific Society, in the Moot Hall, in 1873. An important item in the original collection at the Moot Hall was a three-dimensional model of the Lake District, measuring 12 feet by 9 feet, made by Joseph and James Flintoft in 1837.

The collection moved to purpose-built facilities, in Fitz Park, constructed as a memorial to the Hewetson brothers, distinguished Keswick benefactors, in 1897. Cannon Hardwicke Rawnsley, one of founders of the National Trust, attended the opening of the art gallery at the museum, in 1906. 

The Fitz Park Trust got into financial difficulties and the collection was rescued by Allerdale Council in April 1994. Then, in February 2007, Keswick Museum and Art Gallery Management Limited was formed to operate the museum on behalf of the council as the sole trustee.

The building was extensively refurbished, with financial support from the Heritage Lottery Fund, at a cost of £2.1 million between September 2012 and May 2014.

The collection
The museum has a collection of about 20,000 objects, of which 5-10% are on display. While these include material relating to the whole of north Cumbria, the museum now only collects items from the Derwent Seven Parishes, approximately the CA12 postcode area.

The collection includes artifacts from Keswick's landscape, history and culture as well as the three-dimensional model made by Joseph and James Flintoft. It also includes The Musical Stones of Skiddaw, a number of lithophones built across two centuries around the town of Keswick using hornfels, a stone from the nearby Skiddaw mountain, which is said to have a superior tone and longer ring than the more commonly used slate. Other items in the collection include a 700-year-old cat (found mummified within the wall of a church at Clifton near Penrith), a penny-farthing bicycle and a man-trap.

The  Hugh Walpole Collection includes manuscripts of all the Herries novels by Hugh Walpole (four novels set in the Lake District) and letters to Walpole from 13 leading English writers.

The Mountain Heritage Trust maintains a changing exhibition in the museum: in 2018/19 "Man and Mountain" featured Chris Bonington, and in 2019/20 it focused on  Siegfried Herford.

References

External links

The Museum's official Facebook page

  The Museum's 2014 information leaflet
Description of the collections on Allerdale Borough Council website
 Illustrates 44 works

"Kewsick Museum and Art Gallery Management Ltd, registered charity no. 1156330", Charity Commission for England and Wales  

Museums in Cumbria
Art museums and galleries in Cumbria
Geology museums in England
Natural history museums in England
Local museums in Cumbria
Art museums established in 1873
1873 establishments in England 
1897 establishments in England 
Keswick, Cumbria